Paolo Bulgari (born 1937) is an Italian businessman and jewellery designer, a grandson of Sotirios Bulgari, the founder of the luxury brand Bulgari.

Early life
Paolo Bulgari was born in 1937, the second son of Giorgio (Leonidas-Georgios) Voulgaris (1890-1966). His brother Gianni was born in 1935 and Nicola in 1941.

Career
In 2013, after allegations of tax evasion, the Guardia di Finanza (tax police), raided the Bulgari office in Rome's Via Condotti, as part of a Euro 46 million seizure of assets. In May 2015, Paolo and Nicola Bulgari and 11 others were ordered by an Italian judge to stand trial on charges of tax evasion. Both deny the charges.

In May 2015, Forbes estimated the net worth of Paolo Bulgari at US$1.3 billion.

Personal life
Bulgari lives in Rome.

References

1937 births
Paolo
Businesspeople from Rome
Italian businesspeople in fashion
Italian billionaires
Italian chief executives
Italian people of Greek descent
Italian people of Aromanian descent
Italian jewellery designers
Living people